The Japanese keelback (Hebius vibakari) is a species of colubrid snake, which is endemic to Asia.

Geographic range
It is found in northeastern China, Japan (Honshu, Kyushu, Shikoku), Korea, and Russia (Amur Oblast, Khabarovsk Krai, Primorsky Krai).

Description

Dorsally it is olive or reddish brown, with small blackish spots. Some specimens may have a dark olive or blackish vertebral stripe. The upper labials are yellow, with black sutures. On each side of the nape of the neck there is a yellow dark-edged diagonal streak, these two streaks converging posteriorly. Ventrally it is yellow, with a series of brown dots or short lines at the outer ends of the ventral scales.

Dorsal scales strongly keeled (except outer row), arranged in 19 rows at midbody. Ventrals 127–151; anal plate divided; subcaudals divided 59–79.

References

Further reading
 Boie, H. 1826. Merkmale eineger japanischer Lurche. Isis von Oken 19: 203–216. (Tropidonotus vibakari, p. 207.)

Hebius
Reptiles of China
Reptiles of Japan
Taxa named by Heinrich Boie
Reptiles described in 1826
Reptiles of Russia
Reptiles of Korea